BMAPN (βk-methamnetamine) is a substituted cathinone derivative with stimulant effects. It inhibits dopamine reuptake and has rewarding and reinforcing properties in animal studies. It is banned under drug analogue legislation in a number of jurisdictions. The drug was at one point marketed under the name NRG-3, although only a minority of samples of substances sold under this name have been found to actually contain BMAPN, with most such samples containing mixtures of other cathinone derivatives.

See also 
 βk-Ephenidine
 Methamnetamine
 Methylnaphthidate
 Methylone
 Naphyrone
 WF-23

References 

Cathinones
Designer drugs